Stem cell doping is the postulated practice of enhancing athletic performance through various beneficial effects of stem cells injected into the bloodstream or otherwise introduced into the body.  Currently there are no documented cases of stem cell doping, but there are suspicions that the practice may already be emerging.

See also
Doping in sport
Gene doping
List of doping cases in sport
Doping at the Olympic Games
Cheating in sports

References

Drugs in sport
Bioethics
Doping in sport